Handball was inducted at the Youth Olympic Games at the inaugural edition in 2010 for both boys and girls.

From the 2018 edition in Buenos Aires, beach handball replaced handball.

Boys

Summaries

Team appearances

Girls

Summaries

Team appearances

Medal table
As of the 2018 Summer Youth Olympics.

See also
Handball at the Summer Olympics

References

External links
Youth Olympic Games

Youth Olympics
Handball